Dmytro Nikitin (born 31 July 1999) is a Ukrainian high jumper.

He is finalist (5th) at the 2021 European Indoor Championships. His high jump records are 2,28 m (outdoor 2017 and indoor 2021).

References

External links

1999 births
Living people
Ukrainian male high jumpers
Ukrainian Athletics Championships winners